Mary Frances Lucas Keene FRCS (15 August 1885 – 9 May 1977) was professor of anatomy at the London School of Medicine for Women, the first woman professor of anatomy in the United Kingdom, first woman president of the Anatomical Society of Great Britain and Ireland, and a president of the Medical Women's Federation.

Early life and education 
Mary Frances Lucas was born in Gravesend on 15 August 1885. Lucas entered the London School of Medicine for Women in the winter of 1904, and graduated in 1911.

Medical career 
At the outbreak of war in 1914, she was invited back to the London School of Medicine for Women as assistant to the professor of anatomy, Frederic Wood Jones. His wartime work at the military hospital in Shepherd's Bush meant that increasingly Lucas was left on her own to run the department.

During two summer vacations she went with the Dean of the school, Louisa Aldrich-Blake, to volunteer at Royaumont Abbey in northern France, where the Scottish Women's Hospitals for Foreign Service ran a large hospital for casualties.

In 1916 she married Richard Keene, and in 1919 was appointed head of department when Wood Jones moved to Manchester.

After the war, Keene spent most of her career working in the anatomy department. Her roles included lecturer, senior demonstrator and head of department. In 1924 she was appointed Professor of Anatomy: it was widely reported at the time that she was the world's first female professor of anatomy.

She was elected president of the Medical Women's Federation and held the role from 1946-48.

In 1956 she was elected a Fellow of the Royal College of Surgeons.

Death and legacy 
Mary Frances Lucas Keene died 9 May 1977 in Dover.

Published Works 
 M. F. Lucas Keene, E. E. Hewer (October 1931) Some Observations on Myelination in the Human Central Nervous System Journal of Anatomy 1931;6:1–13.
Keene, Mary F. Lucas; Whillis, J.(1950) Anatomy for Dental Students; Published by Edward Arnold & Co.

References

1885 births
1977 deaths
English anatomists
Fellows of the Royal College of Surgeons